A gamer is one who plays and/or devises games, especially role-playing or video games.

Gamer(s) may also refer to:

People
 Gambler, a person who gambles
 esports competitor, a person who competes in eSports
 Cheater, a person who cheats (games) the system

Surnamed
 Carlton Gamer (born 1929), American composer and music theorist

Film
 Gamer (2011 film), a 2011 Ukrainian film
 Gamer (2009 film), a 2009 science fiction thriller
 The Gamers (film), a 2002 low-budget cult film, followed by the sequels, The Gamers: Dorkness Rising and The Gamers: Hands of Fate
 Gamers: The Movie, a 2006 mockumentary

Television
 G@mers (TV series)
 Gamer.tv, a UK video-game programme

Literature
 The Gamer, a Korean comic
 Gamers!, a 2015 Japanese light novel series

Companies
 The Gamers, a wargaming company
 Gamers, a retail chain operated by the Japanese media company Broccoli
 Gamers (US retailer), a retail video game chain located primarily in Iowa and Nebraska

Other uses
 Gamers (album), a 1996 album by The Conscious Daughters

See also

 Game (disambiguation)
 Gaming (disambiguation)
 Gambling (disambiguation)